Junior Félix Madrigal Ortíz (born 2 June 1982) is a Mexican footballer who plays as a goalkeeper for La Piedad.

Career
Madrigal made his professional debut for Monarcas Morelia on 23 October 2003, replacing an injured Moisés Muñoz at minute 80, during a 1–0 victory over San Luis.

In 2007, he made a move to the Venezuela outfit Carabobo FC, and made a handful of starts for them as goalee.

During the Apertura 2009 season, he returned to Mexico to play for La Piedad.

External links

1982 births
Living people
Liga MX players
Atlético Morelia players
Expatriate footballers in Venezuela
Association football goalkeepers
Sportspeople from Morelia
Footballers from Michoacán
Mexican footballers